Elfed High School is an 11–16 mixed, English-medium community secondary school in Buckley, Flintshire, Wales.

History 
Opened in 1954, the school was named after Hywel Elfed Lewis 1860-1953, the renowned bard and scholar who served as Archdruid of the National Eisteddfod of Wales from 1924 to 1928. In 1967 it became a Senior Comprehensive, serving a wide catchment area, including Buckley, Hawarden, Mynydd Isa, Saltney, Caergwrle and Hope. The school became fully comprehensive in 1973, serving the communities of Buckley, Mynydd Isa, Drury and surrounding areas.  The main partner primary schools are Southdown, Westwood, Mountain Lane and Drury schools, but the school also attracts pupils from a number of others. Students from outside the normal catchment area who choose to attend the Elfed HS use public transport. The vast majority of students use bicycles or walk to school.

From September 2015 the Elfed HS education provision was re-categorized by the Flintshire Local Authority from 11-18 to 11-16.

Elfed High School is currently rated excellent by Estyn.

Elfed High School recently changed there uniform from a maroon jumper, into a blue jumper and blazer. This was done in the 2021-22 academic year.

Notable alumni 
Captain John Scragg, Puget Sound Pilot, WABPC (Washington State) Unlimited Master Motor and Sail (United States Coast Guard)
 Ann Keen (née Fox), Labour MP for Brentford and Isleworth
 Sylvia Heal (née Fox), Labour MP for Halesowen and Rowley Regis
 Kim Ashfield, winner of Miss United Kingdom and Miss Wales in 1980
 Ryan Shawcross, footballer, Stoke City FC.
 Danny Collins, footballer, Wales and Nottingham Forest FC.
 John Lyons (footballer), Wrexham FC, Millwall FC, Cambridge United FC and Colchester United FC.
 Cherry Frampton, former glamour model.

References

External links
 

Secondary schools in Flintshire
Educational institutions established in 1954
1954 establishments in Wales